Mothabari Assembly constituency is an assembly constituency in Malda district in the Indian state of West Bengal.

Overview
As per orders of the Delimitation Commission, No. 52 Mothabari Assembly constituency covers Kaliachak II community development block, and  Alinagar and Kaliachak I gram panchayats of Kaliachak I community development block.

Mothabari Assembly constituency is part of No. 8 Maldaha Dakshin (Lok Sabha constituency).

Members of Legislative Assembly

Election results

2021
In the 2021 election, Sabina Yasmin of Trinamool Congress defeated her nearest rival, Shyam Chand Ghosh of BJP.

2016
In the 2016 election, Sabina Yasmin of Congress defeated her nearest rival, Md. Najrul Islam of Trinamool Congress.

2011
In the 2011 election, Sabina Yasmin of Congress defeated her nearest rival Naimuddin Sheikh of CPI(M).

The Independent candidate, Shehnaz Quadery, was a rebel candidate from the family of A. B. A. Ghani Khan Choudhury. Although her name was proposed by the local Congress, she was refused a ticket by the Congress high command.

References

Assembly constituencies of West Bengal
Politics of Malda district
2011 establishments in West Bengal
Constituencies established in 2011